General elections were held in the Federal Republic of Central America in 1825 to elect the President of Central America as the 1824 Central America Constitution established. The liberal-dominated Congress called upon the election which was held in all five member states; Costa Rica, El Salvador, Guatemala, Honduras and Nicaragua. The two main parties were the Liberals and the Conservatives.

After the election conservative candidate José Cecilio del Valle obtained 41 electoral votes and his main rival, liberal Manuel José Arce, gained 34 of a total of 79 electoral votes cast. The total of electoral votes were supposed to be 82, so the liberal-lead Congress declared the election void arguing that no candidate obtained a majority and appointed Arce as president, much to the outrage of Valle and his supporters.

Arce tried to appease Valle by offering him the Vice-Presidency, but Valle declined. He did retired from Congress without calling for an uprising. Nevertheless, civil war would happen anyway as Arce’s centralism and authoritarian government would cause the uprising of the Liberals in El Salvador and Honduras that sprang after Arce dissolved the Parliament in Guatemala in 1826. Arce would eventually resign as president and the war would only end when rebel leader Francisco Morazán took over Guatemala in 1829, calling for new elections soon afterwards.

References

1825
1825 elections in North America
Federal election